Alas Dose sa Trese is a Philippine noontime show aired over IBC from July 24, 1999, to November 3, 2000.

History
On July 24, 1999, former Student Canteen main host Eddie Ilarde resurfaced in the noontime scene as host of IBC noontime show Alas Dose sa Trese. He was joined by the mother-daughter tandem of Boots Anson-Roa (a former host of the original Student Canteen), Chiqui Roa-Puno (newscaster of PTV and one of the top female sportscasters at that time), Ernani "Jong" Cuenco, Pia Pilapil, Jojo Alejar, and actor-musician Paco Arespacochaga in the show.

Some elements of Student Canteen were seen in the show, along with former contestants from "Student Canteen"'s singing portions who gamely sang and entertained audiences via the segment "Student Canteen Corner".

The show ended on November 3, 2000, due to low ratings and was replaced by Lunch Break, produced by the controversial Mateo Management Group.

See also
 List of programs previously broadcast by Intercontinental Broadcasting Corporation

Intercontinental Broadcasting Corporation original programming
Philippine variety television shows
1990s Philippine television series
1999 Philippine television series debuts
2000 Philippine television series endings
Filipino-language television shows